A molecular switch is a molecule that can be reversibly shifted between two or more stable states. The molecules may be shifted between the states in response to environmental stimuli, such as changes in pH, light, temperature, an electric current, microenvironment, or in the presence of ions and other ligands. In some cases, a combination of stimuli is required. The oldest forms of synthetic molecular switches are pH indicators, which display distinct colors as a function of pH. Currently synthetic molecular switches are of interest in the field of nanotechnology for application in molecular computers or responsive drug delivery systems. Molecular switches are also important in biology because many biological functions are based on it, for instance allosteric regulation and vision. They are also one of the simplest examples of molecular machines.

Biological molecular switches 

In cellular biology, proteins act as intracellular signaling molecules by activating another protein in a signaling pathway. In order to do this, proteins can switch between active and inactive states, thus acting as molecular switches in response to another signal. For example, phosphorylation of proteins can be used to activate or inactivate proteins. The external signal flipping the molecular switch could be a protein kinase, which adds a phosphate group to the protein, or a protein phosphatase, which removes phosphate groups.

Acidochromic molecular switches 

The capacity of some compounds to change in function of the pH was known since the sixteenth century. This effect was even known before the development of acid-base theory. Those are found in a wide range of plants like roses, cornflowers, primroses and violets. Robert Boyle was the first person to describe this effect, employing plant juices (in the forms of solution and impregnated paper).

Molecular switches are most commonly used as pH indicators, which are molecules with acidic or basic properties. Their acidic and basic forms have different colors. When an acid or a base is added, the equilibrium between the two forms is displaced.

Photochromic molecular switches 
A widely studied class are photochromic compounds which are able to switch between electronic configurations when irradiated by light of a specific wavelength. Each state has a specific absorption maximum which can then be read out by UV-VIS spectroscopy. Members of this class include azobenzenes, diarylethenes, dithienylethenes, fulgides, stilbenes, spiropyrans and phenoxynaphthacene quinones.

Chiroptical molecular switches are a specific subgroup with photochemical switching taking place between an enantiomeric pairs. In these compounds the readout is by circular dichroism rather than by ordinary spectroscopy. Hindered alkenes such as the one depicted below change their helicity (see: planar chirality) as response to irradiation with right or left-handed circularly polarized light

Chiroptical molecular switches that show directional motion are considered synthetic molecular motors:

Host–guest molecular switches
In host–guest chemistry the bistable states of molecular switches differ in their affinity for guests. Many early examples of such systems are based on crown ether chemistry. The first switchable host is described in 1978 by Desvergne & Bouas-Laurent who create a crown ether via photochemical  anthracene dimerization. Although not strictly speaking switchable the compound is able to take up cations after a photochemical trigger and exposure to acetonitrile gives back the open form.

In 1980 Yamashita et al. construct a crown ether already incorporating the anthracene units (an anthracenophane) and also study ion uptake vs photochemistry.

Also in 1980 Shinkai throws out the anthracene unit as photoantenna in favor of an azobenzene moiety and for the first time envisions the existence of molecules with an on-off switch. In this molecule light triggers a trans-cis isomerization of the azo group which results in ring expansion. Thus in the trans form the crown binds preferentially to ammonium, lithium and sodium ions while in the cis form the preference is for potassium and rubidium (both larger ions in same alkali metal group). In the dark the reverse isomerization takes place.

Shinkai employs this devices in actual ion transport mimicking the biochemical action of monensin and nigericin: in a biphasic system ions are taken up triggered by light in one phase and deposited in the other phase in absence of light.

Mechanically-interlocked molecular switches 
Some of the most advanced molecular switches are based on mechanically-interlocked molecular architectures where the bistable states differ in the position of the macrocycle. In 1991 Stoddart devices a molecular shuttle based on a rotaxane on which a molecular bead is able to shuttle between two docking stations situated on a molecular thread. Stoddart predicts that when the stations are dissimilar with each of the stations addressed by a different external stimulus the shuttle becomes a molecular machine. In 1993 Stoddart is scooped by supramolecular chemistry pioneer Fritz Vögtle who actually delivers a switchable molecule based  not on a rotaxane but on a related catenane

This compound is based on two ring systems: one ring holds the photoswichable azobenzene ring and two paraquat docking stations and the other ring is a polyether with to arene rings with binding affinity for the paraquat units. In this system NMR spectroscopy shows that in the azo trans-form the polyether ring is free to rotate around its partner ring but then when a light trigger activates the cis azo form this rotation mode is stopped

Kaifer and Stoddart in 1994 modify their molecular shuttle such a way that an electron-poor tetracationic cyclophane bead now has a choice between two docking stations: one biphenol and one benzidine unit. In solution at room temperature NMR spectroscopy reveals that the bead shuttles at a rate comparable to the NMR timescale, reducing the temperature to 229K resolves the signals with 84% of the population favoring the benzidine station. However, on addition of trifluoroacetic acid, the benzidine nitrogen atoms are protonated and the bead is fixed permanently on the biphenol station. The same effect is obtained by electrochemical oxidation (forming the benzidine radical ion) and significantly both processes are reversible.

In 2007 molecular shuttles were utilized in an experimental DRAM circuit. The device consists of 400 bottom silicon nanowire electrodes (16 nanometer (nm) wide at 33 nm intervals) crossed by another 400 titanium top-nanowires with similar dimensions sandwiching a monolayer of a bistable rotaxane depicted below:

Each bit in the device consists of a silicon and a titanium crossbar with around 100 rotaxane molecules filling in the space between them at perpendicular angles. The hydrophilic diethylene glycol stopper on the left (gray) is specifically designed to anchor to the silicon wire (made hydrophilic by phosphorus doping) while the hydrophobic tetraarylmethane stopper on the right does the same to the likewise hydrophobic titanium wire.  In the ground state of the switch, the paraquat ring is located around a tetrathiafulvalene unit (in red) but it moves to the dioxynaphthyl unit (in green) when the fulvalene unit is oxidized by application of a current. When the fulvalene is reduced back a metastable high conductance '1' state is formed which relaxes back to the ground state with a chemical half-life of around one hour. The problem of defects is circumvented by adopting a defect-tolerant architecture also found in the Teramac project. In this way a circuit is obtained consisting of 160,000 bits on an area the size of a white blood cell translating into 1011 bits per square centimeter.

References

Further reading

Supramolecular chemistry
Molecular machines